Triathlon at the 2008 Asian Beach Games was held 26 October 2008 in Bali, Indonesia.

Medalists

Medal table

Results

Men's individual
26 October

Women's individual
26 October

References
 Official site

2008 Asian Beach Games events
Asian Beach Games
2008